Homoeocera sahacon is a moth of the subfamily Arctiinae! first described by Herbert Druce in 1896. It is found in Panama.

References

Euchromiina
Moths described in 1896